Ussimäe is a village in Sõmeru Parish, Lääne-Viru County, in northeastern Estonia.

Actress Elina Purde was born and raised in Ussimäe.

References

 

Villages in Lääne-Viru County